Chelsea Abbey Brook (born 29 July 1998) is an Australian professional basketball player for the Adelaide Lightning of the Women's National Basketball League (WNBL).

Early life
Brook hails from country South Australia in Truro.

Career

WNBL
Brook made her debut in the WNBL with the Adelaide Lightning in the 2016–17 season. She re-signed with the Lightning for the 2017–18 season. She continued with the Lightning in 2018–19, 2019–20, the 2020 Hub season, and again in 2021–22.

State Leagues
In 2016 and 2017, Brook played for the Norwood Flames in the South Australian Premier League, winning a championship in her first season. In 2018, she continued in the Premier League for the Sturt Sabes. In 2019, she played in the inaugural NBL1 season with the Eltham Wildcats. In 2021, she played for the Mackay Meteorettes in the NBL1 North.

Brook is set to play for the Darwin Salties in the 2022 NBL1 North season.

National team
In 2017, Brook played for the Australian National University Team at the World University Games in Taipei, where Australia won gold.

References

External links
NBL1 profile
2017 Universiade profile

1998 births
Living people
Adelaide Lightning players
Australian women's basketball players
Basketball players from Adelaide
Centers (basketball)
Medalists at the 2017 Summer Universiade
Power forwards (basketball)
Universiade gold medalists for Australia
Universiade medalists in basketball